The 2005–06 Charlotte Bobcats season was Charlotte's 16th season in the National Basketball Association (NBA), and their second as the Bobcats. The Bobcats moved from the Charlotte Coliseum to the Charlotte Bobcats Arena. During their second season under the Bobcats name, they would become the fourth team to start out their season with three different overtime games within their first six games to start out the regular season.

Draft picks

Roster

Regular season

Season standings

Record vs. opponents

Game log

Player statistics

Awards and records
NBA All-Rookie Second Team
 Raymond Felton

Transactions

References

Charlotte Bobcats seasons
Bob
Bob